An open letter is a letter that is intended to be read by a wide audience.

Open Letter may also refer to:

 Open Letter (Loose Tubes album), 1988
 Open Letter (Case album)
 Open Letter (Ralph Towner album)
 "Open Letter" (Jay-Z song), 2013
 Open Letter Books, an American publisher owned by the University of Rochester specializing in translated works

See also
 "Open Letter (To a Landlord)", a song by the New York City band Living Colour from their 1988 debut album Vivid